Hannah Jayne Knight (born 25 August 1979) is a Welsh former cricketer who played as an all-rounder.

Biography
She was a right-handed batter and right-arm medium bowler. She appeared in five One Day Internationals for England. She made her debut against the Netherlands in July 1999 and played her last match against South Africa in August 2003. She also represented England at under-17, under-21 and under-23 levels. She played domestic cricket for West of England from 1996 to 1999 and then for Somerset between 2000 and 2009. She also played for Central Districts in the 2003–04 State League. She is the daughter of the late Glamorgan cricketer Barry Lloyd.

References

External links
 
 

1979 births
Living people
Cricketers from Neath
Welsh women cricketers
England women One Day International cricketers
Central Districts Hinds cricketers
Somerset women cricketers
Somerset women cricket captains
West women cricketers